The Soikinsky Peninsula in Kingiseppsky District, Leningrad Oblast, Russia projects out into the Gulf of Finland, separating the Luga Bay from the Koporye Bay. Its name is derived from Soikkola, which is the Izhorian word for the peninsula.

The most populous village, also known as Soikino, was destroyed during World War II. Currently the main settlement is Vistino, which has a museum dedicated to the Izhorian heritage of the region. An oil terminal is slated to be constructed at Vistino, starting from 2009.

Landforms of Leningrad Oblast
Peninsulas of Russia